Pratuang Emjaroen (October 9, 1935 – March 7, 2022) was a Thai artist.

Biography
Born in 1935, Pratuang started his career as a self-taught artist in the 1970s. In the beginning, he worked as a painter for billboards and movie posters of cinema industry.

In 1971, he founded Dhamma Group.

Works
 The Universe

Recognition
  National Exhibition of Arts Award
 National Artist (2005)

References

1935 births
2022 deaths
Thai artists
National Artists of Thailand